Zlidol Gate (‘Zlidolska Porta’ \'zli-dol-ska 'por-ta\) is the saddle of elevation over 800 m on Trinity Peninsula, Antarctic Peninsula separating Detroit Plateau to the west from Trakiya Heights to the east.  The feature is horseshoe-shaped, jutting out to Russell West Glacier to the north, with its southern approach from Victory Glacier narrowing to 500 m.

The saddle is named after the settlement of Zlidol in northwestern Bulgaria.

Location
German-British mapping in 1996.

Maps
 Trinity Peninsula. Scale 1:250000 topographic map No. 5697. Institut für Angewandte Geodäsie and British Antarctic Survey, 1996.
 Antarctic Digital Database (ADD). Scale 1:250000 topographic map of Antarctica. Scientific Committee on Antarctic Research (SCAR), 1993–2016.

References
 Bulgarian Antarctic Gazetteer. Antarctic Place-names Commission. (details in Bulgarian, basic data in English)
 Zlidol Gate. SCAR Composite Antarctic Gazetteer

External links
 Zlidol Gate. Copernix satellite image

Mountain passes of Trinity Peninsula
Bulgaria and the Antarctic